Cessna Stadium is a 24,000-seat stadium on the campus of Wichita State University in Wichita, Kansas, United States. It opened in 1946 and served as the home of the Wichita State Shockers track and field team until 2020 and the football team until the program was discontinued in 1986. The Kansas Board of Regents approved demolition of the stadium in April 2020. In September of 2022, The Kansas Board of Regents approved the plan for a new, roughly $51 million stadium to replace the current facility. This project will be done in phases, and is expected to be completed sometime during 2025.

History
In the early days of Wichita State University, when it was known as Fairmount College, its first football field was located on the north side of 17th Street, immediately east of the current Henrion Hall, when it was the Henrion Gymnasium.  In 1929, concrete bleachers were attached to the east side of the same building for football games.

In 1940, the school decided to build a new football stadium on the north side of campus at the current site on the south side of 21st Street.  On January 6, 1941, ground was broken for Veterans Field, and by September 1942 the bowl was excavated, foundations were poured for the west stands, and a quarter of the west bleachers were completed; however, construction was halted due to metal shortages during World War II.  After the war ended, the bleachers were constructed in sections over time as funds were incrementally available.  By mid-1946, stands were completed to a point where 6,000 seats were ready by the start of the 1946 football season.  Veterans Field was finally completed before the start of the 1948 football season, with 15,000 seats and facilities for the press, concessions stands, and locker rooms.  It was dedicated on November 25, 1948 during a football game with the University of Nevada.  The stadium was dedicated to the members of the armed forces from Sedgwick County who served in World War II.

In 1967, Wichita State started considering the expansion of Veterans Field.  In 1968, faculty and students voted and approved the expansion by adding on top of the existing stands of Veterans Field.  Cessna Aircraft Company pledged a donation of $300,000 for the proposed stadium, and it was renamed to Cessna Stadium.  The cost of the expansion was $1.5 Million, and the school had a fund drive to raise the remaining money.  Construction was started on February 7, 1969 and completed in September. It was one of the most modern and complete football facilities in the nation at the time of its completion.

Wichita State University rededicated the facility on April 16, 2002 to mark the end of the seven-month, $1.3 million construction that included adding an eighth lane and resurfacing the track, reconfiguring the infield event layout, and building separate locker rooms for the Shocker men's and women's track and field teams, and a reduction of overall seating capacity. The first event in the renovated facility was WSU's annual K. T. Woodman Track and Field Classic, which is scheduled every April.

Football

The Wichita State Shockers football team was an NCAA Division I football program. The Shockers fielded a team from 1897 to 1986. They played home games at Cessna Stadium and were members of the Missouri Valley Conference when the program was discontinued in 1986.

Cessna was the location of a Pittsburg State-Mesa State Division II college football game.  The stadium has also played host to numerous Kansas State High School Football Championship games, including the Kansas Shrine Bowl, Kansas's high school all-star football game and high school football games from nearby Kapaun Mt. Carmel High School.

Teams that use Cessna Stadium

Track and field
Wichita State Shockers track and field used the facility until 2020. It has hosted several Missouri Valley Conference Championships and hosted the 2019 American Athletic Conference Outdoor Track and Field Championships.

Since 1970 (except 1978 and 2020), it is home to the Kansas state high school track and field meet, an event that brings all Kansas high school qualifiers to one location.

In April of each year until the demolition was approved, Cessna Stadium is the venue for the K. T. Woodman Invitational, a track and field meet for high schools, junior colleges, and many top collegiate track programs of the Midwest.

Football
Cessna was used by Kapaun Mount Carmel High School of the Greater Wichita Athletic League as its home field for varsity football games through 2018.  Other high school games were played at Cessna Stadium from time to time.

Public
Cessna Stadium is open to the public for recreational use Monday through Friday from 6:30 a.m. to 5:30 p.m.  It is closed on holidays and during WSU track & field practices and special events.  In April 2017, WSU decided to change their policy, a $100 deposit is now required to get a key to use their facilities.

Demolition
On April 15, 2020, the Kansas Board of Regents approved demolition of the stadium, citing the high cost of repairs needed. Following the approval, no immediate plan was made for a new football stadium, a track and field specific stadium, or a new home for the school's track program. On September 26, 2022, the University presented its plan for a new facility to the Kansas Board of Regents. The plan calls for a roughly $51 million rebuild of the stadium, with a seating capacity of around 10,000 spectators. The project will be done in four separate phases, with phase 1A to begin in August 2023, demolishing the east stands and replacing it with a seating berm for 2,390 people. This phase will also include new lighting, ticket pavilions, restrooms, storage buildings, and a plaza. Phase 1B will follow in June 2024, with the track being replaced with a wider 8-lane, 400m track that will allow for a regulation size soccer field on the infield. In addition, there will be aluminum bleachers added to both the north and south sides of the track. 

The second phase of the project, which will replace the west stands, is a combined 2A/2B project. Phase 2A will be the demolition of phase of the project, which can be done as early as June of 2025. Lastly, phase 2B will cost $39.5 million, building new permanent stands for the west side, as well as a pedestrian plaza between the stadium and Charles Koch Arena.

See also
 Charles Koch Arena (basketball and volleyball)
 Eck Stadium (baseball)

References

External links

 Cessna Stadium information, wichita.edu
 WSU Campus Map, wichita.edu
Historical
 Wichita State celebrates Veterans Field rededication in 2010, wichita.edu
 Photos: 
 1965 aerial view of Veterans Field, wichitaphotos.org
 1955 aerial view of west side of Veterans Field during construction of Round House, photo at bottom of page 68
 1955 aerial view of original football field along 17th street, wichitaphotos.org

Athletics (track and field) venues in Kansas
College track and field venues in the United States
Soccer venues in Kansas
Music venues in Kansas
Defunct college football venues
Sports venues in Wichita, Kansas
American football venues in Kansas
Buildings and structures in Wichita, Kansas
1969 establishments in Kansas
Sports venues completed in 1969
College soccer venues in the United States
Cessna